Listenbourg is a fictional country created as the subject of an internet meme in October 2022, which depicts it as an extension of the Iberian Peninsula. French Twitter user Gaspard Hoelscher shared a doctored map of Europe with a red arrow pointing to the outline of a pasted country adjacent to Portugal and Spain, and joked that Americans would not be able to name the country.

The nonexistent nation went viral on social networks, with some major brands, national politicians and official organisations playing along with the joke.

Origin

The trend started as an internet meme posted by a French user intending to test the stereotype of Americans having a poor grasp of European geography.

On October 30, 2022, Gaspard Hoelscher, known as @gaspardooo on Twitter, shared a photoshopped map of Europe with an additional landmass attached to the Iberian peninsula. The post was captioned: "Je suis sûr que les américains ne connaissent même pas le nom de ce pays ptdrrr". Another user responded with the rhetorical question "Qui ne connaît pas le listenbourg?", giving the hoax its name.

The country's name has been described as sounding like a blend of "Luxembourg" with "Lithuania" and/or "Liechtenstein".

Viral spread
The joke became a viral phenomenon with other Twitter users offering invented facts about the country, doctored photographs and satellite maps purporting to show aspects of it. Dozens of Twitter accounts claiming to represent Listenbourg government institutions arose in a few days, and people invented a capital, flag, history, national anthem and culture for the fictional country.

Several large, verified social media handles joined in on the joke. Participants in the joke attempted to flesh out Listenbourg's existence with detailed social media threads. Collaborative actions established that the country was split up into five regions called Fluẞerde, Kusterde, Mitteland, Adrias and Caséière. The population was said to be 59 million. The meme's originator, Gaspardo, was proclaimed president of Listenbourg, although he admitted his prank totally overwhelmed him.

It was noted that the DALL-E artificial intelligence program generated European-style buildings when given the word "Listenbourg" as a prompt.

In November, the nonexistent country was trending on Twitter, and the TikTok hashtag #Listenbourg had more than 75 million views.

Responses
Major organizations and news channels played along with the hoax, although most of them made clear they were not being serious.

On October 31, 2022, the official Paris 2024 Olympics channel tweeted: "The number of Olympic delegations has risen from 206 to 207 with the arrival of Listenbourg".

Amazon Prime Video announced that a report on the history of Listenbourg would be released on the impossible date of "February 31". 

The low-cost carrier Ryanair published the viral map, writing that they were "Proud to be announcing our new base in Listenbourg!"

The French television network TF1 presented a realistic weather report for the imaginary country. 

Toulouse Football Club said its team was going to a training camp in the fictional nation. The prank also reached the Formula 1 Grand Prix, with the Canal+ Sport supporting the sham state.

On November 1, 2022, the GPS navigation software company Waze posted in French a tweet of "Le Listenbourg, nous au moins on sait comment y aller!". 

French politician Jean Lassalle pretended to have visited an agricultural festival in Listenbourg. 

The French city of Nice announced a twinning with the Listenbourg's capital, while its official airport inaugurated a new air link to the extra chunk of land. 

Other brands and organisations that posted about Listenbourg include the ski resort of La Clusaz, the British online food delivery Deliveroo, the restaurant chain Buffalo Grill, the Parisian transportation operator RATP Group, the high-speed TGV trains of the National society of French railroads and the French national hockey team.

See also
 Absurdistan
 List of fictional countries
 Molvanîa
 Veyshnoria
 San Escobar
 Ruritania
 Galicia (Spain), an actual region corresponding to parts of Listenbourg in reality

References

Internet memes introduced in 2022
Internet humor
Fictional European countries
Fictitious entries
Internet hoaxes
Hoaxes in France
2022 hoaxes